Shakti Anand (born 23 September 1975) is an Indian television actor. He appeared in various television  shows like  Tenali Rama, Saara Akaash, Sambhav Asambhav and Ek Ladki Anjaani Si. The actor also hosted the first season of the crime reality show Crime Patrol in 2004.

Early life
Anand was born on 23 September 1975 in Delhi in a Punjabi family. He studied at the Tamil Education Association university in Delhi and majored in the Science stream. After that, he received his master's degree in pharmaceutical engineering.

Personal life
Anand married actress Sai Deodhar in 2005. They have a daughter born in 2011.

Career
Shakti received the offer to act in the television show Kyunki Saas Bhi Kabhi Bahu Thi while he was working as a medical examiner with GE Capital in Delhi. He played a blind boy in telefilm Nayan Jyoti, produced by Deepak Sharma and edited by Sanjeev Khanna for Doordarshan.

Shakti and his wife Sai Deodhar participated in the first season of the celebrity dance show Nach Baliye. In the serial Godh Bharaai, he performed as the character Shivam.
The actor had worked in the daily soap called Bharat Ka Veer Putra – Maharana Pratap as Maharana Udai Singh. He has also worked in the show SuperCops vs Supervillains on Life OK. Shakti was also seen as Shiv in the show Gangaa on &TV and as Emperor Balakumara in popular  Tenali Rama aired on Sony SAB. Anand was last seen playing Amber Singh, in the show  Channa Mereya that aired on Star Bharat. 

Since March 2022 he is portraying Karan Luthra replacing Shakti Arora post generation leap in Zee TV's Kundali Bhagya.

Filmography

Television

Films

Web series

References

External links

Living people
1975 births
Punjabi people
21st-century Indian male actors
Indian male television actors
People from Delhi